Héni Kechi (born 31 August 1980 in Djerba) is a French track and field athlete who specialises in the 400 metres hurdles.

Achievements

References

 

1980 births
Living people
French male hurdlers
People from Djerba
20th-century French people
21st-century French people